Park Ridge is one of two commuter railroad stations on Metra's Union Pacific Northwest Line in the city of Park Ridge, Illinois.

As of April 25, 2022, Park Ridge is served by 44 trains (22 in each direction) on weekdays, by 31 trains (16 inbound, 15 outbound) on Saturdays, and by 19 trains (nine inbound, 10 outbound) on Sundays.

Parking is available on both sides of the tracks. On the north side, on-street parking can be found along Summit Avenue and Busse Highway, and a parking lot can be found on the southwest corner of Summit and Touhy Avenues. On the south side of the tracks, the parking areas are much further away from the station south of Main Street. Among these are street-side parking along Garden Avenue beginning halfway between Prospect and Fairview Avenues and halfway between Prairie Avenue and Third Street, one parking lot on the south side of Garden Avenue between Fairview and Prospect Avenues, street-side parking along Prairie Avenue north of Garden Street, which end at parking lots on both sides of Prairie Avenue, and another parking lot next to the one on the east side of Prairie along Fairview Avenue.

Unlike nearby , Park Ridge's main station provides bus connections for both Pace and CTA buses. Park Ridge serves as the northern terminus of CTA's Route 68 Northwest Highway.

Transportation 
Buses

CTA

 68 Northwest Highway 

Pace

 209 Busse Highway (weekdays only) 
 241 Greenwood/Talcott (weekday rush hours only)
 290 Touhy Avenue

References

External links

Outbound Metra Train at Park Ridge Station (Metra Railfan Photos)
Station from Prospect Avenue from Google Maps Street View

Metra stations in Illinois
Station
Former Chicago and North Western Railway stations
Railway stations in the United States opened in 1960
Railway stations in Cook County, Illinois